Ayoze García Pérez (born 22 November 1985), known simply as Ayoze, is a retired Spanish footballer who played as a left back. He is currently an assistant coach for USL Championship club Indy Eleven.

He spent most of his professional career with Tenerife and the New York Cosmos, signing with the latter club in 2013. He then spent five seasons with second-tier side Indy Eleven.

Club career

Spain
Born in Puerto de la Cruz, Tenerife, Ayoze made his professional debut with CD Tenerife in Segunda División, then had a loan spell at neighbours UD Las Palmas, in 2004–05's Segunda División B.

Upon his return, he became an essential midfield element in the subsequent seasons: from 2006 to 2008 he only missed eight league games combined and scored 14 times, helping the Canary Islands club achieve promotion to La Liga in 2009. In the subsequent campaign he was used regularly (25 matches, three goals) albeit not an undisputed starter, as the team was immediately relegated back; his debut in the Spanish top flight took place on 19 September 2009, as he came on as a 62nd-minute substitute in a 0–4 away loss against RCD Mallorca.

In mid-May 2010, after negotiations to renew his link did not produce any results, Ayoze left Tenerife and signed for three years with Sporting de Gijón, which in turn retained its top division status. He terminated his contract with the Asturians on 31 August 2012 after two seasons of insignificant playing time, the second one ending in relegation.

NY Cosmos

Aged 27, Ayoze moved abroad for the first time, joining the New York Cosmos of the North American Soccer League. In his first year with the team he was an important player, helping it to wins in the NASL Fall Championship and the Soccer Bowl; he tallied one assist, and was part of a defence that ranked first after allowing the fewest goals in the league (12).

On 13 November 2013, Ayoze was signed to a contract extension. During the 2014 Spring season he scored two goals and recorded one assist, once again helping his team finish as the one with the fewest goals conceded and setting a modern-day NASL shutout streak record of 372 minutes.

Ayoze provided the assist on Mads Stokkelien's goal that gave the Cosmos a 1–0 lead during an eventual 1–2 defeat against the San Antonio Scorpions on 8 November 2014, in The Championship's semi-finals.

Indy Eleven
On 6 February 2018, Ayoze signed with the United Soccer League's Indy Eleven.

Ayoze finished his record-breaking five seasons with Indy Eleven from 2018-22 as the club’s career leader in games played (126), games started (106), and assists (22), and placed tied for fifth with 13 goals. He is one of just three players to appear in games across five seasons for Indiana’s Team, joining his contemporary Karl Ouimette (2018-22) and “Eleven Original” Brad Ring (2014-18) on that distinguished short list.

Coaching
Following his retirement from playing, Ayoze stayed in Indiana by joining Mark Lowry's Indy Eleven staff.

Honours
New York Cosmos
North American Soccer League: 2013 Fall Championship
Soccer Bowl 2013

References

External links

 
 
 

1985 births
Living people
Footballers from Puerto de la Cruz
Spanish footballers
Association football defenders
Association football wingers
Association football utility players
La Liga players
Segunda División players
Segunda División B players
Tercera División players
CD Tenerife B players
CD Tenerife players
UD Las Palmas players
Sporting de Gijón players
North American Soccer League players
USL Championship players
New York Cosmos (2010) players
Indy Eleven players
Spanish expatriate footballers
Expatriate soccer players in the United States
Spanish expatriate sportspeople in the United States
Indy Eleven coaches
USL Championship coaches